Silver Lake is a lake located by Perry, New York.

Silver Lake is one of several smaller lakes in the region (e.g. Waneta, and Lamoka lakes). Silver Lake is west of Conesus Lake, and would seem to qualify as a Finger Lake because it is in the Great Lakes watershed.

Fish species present in the lake are black bullhead, northern pike, largemouth bass, bluegill, pumpkinseed sunfish, yellow perch, black crappie, rock bass, and walleye. There is state owned public access with hard surface ramp on the southwest shore at Silver Lake State Park.

References

Bodies of water of Wyoming County, New York
Lakes of New York (state)